Fowlerichthys avalonis, known as the roughbar frogfish, is a species of fish in the family Antennariidae. It is native to the East Pacific, where it ranges from California's Santa Catalina Island to Peru. This species reaches 33 cm (13 inches) in total length, and it is found in rocky areas from the intertidal zone down to a depth of 300 m (984 ft). Young individuals of this species primarily feed on crustaceans, although they start to consume more and more fish as they grow, with adults primarily feeding on other fish, including fishes their own size, which the frogfish catch by striking quickly with their rapidly expanding mouths, a behavior typical of frogfish and some other anglerfish. The species is demersal and oviparous. This species contains remnants of the previously recognized group of A. ocellatus, which became recovered as their sister group for the Antennarius paraphyletic genus. In other words, this species of frogfish became somewhat of an addition to the widely known group of A. ocellatus, that is directly referring to the oscar fish which can be considered one of the species who has shared part of its evolutionary history with frogfish species, that includes the roughbar frogfish.

References

Further reading
 

Antennariidae
Fish described in 1907